Appleton Wire Works was a paper manufacturing facility in Appleton, Wisconsin, United States. It was added to the National Register of Historic Places in 2008 for its industrial significance. The company was the largest wire-weaving company in the United States before it was sold in 1968. The building now houses an apartment complex.

References

Apartment buildings in Wisconsin
Industrial buildings and structures on the National Register of Historic Places in Wisconsin
Industrial buildings completed in 1896
National Register of Historic Places in Outagamie County, Wisconsin
Pulp and paper companies of the United States